A-type asteroids are relatively uncommon inner-belt asteroids that have a strong, broad 1 μm olivine feature and a very reddish spectrum shortwards of 0.7 μm. They are thought to come from the completely differentiated mantle of an asteroid, and appear to have a high density.

List
A-type asteroids are so rare that as of February 2019, only 17 had been discovered:

See also
Asteroid spectral types

References

External links 
 Mineralogic and Temperature-Induced Spectral Investigations of A-type Asteroids: (246) Asporina and (446) Aeternitas, V. Reddy, Lunar and Planetary Science XXXVI (2005)

Asteroid spectral classes